Manjaro is a populated settlement in the Issuna (Isuna) ward of Ikungi District of the Singida Region of Tanzania.

References

External links
 

Populated places in Singida Region